Scott Sloan may refer to:

 Scott Sloan (Doonesbury), a character in the comic strip Doonesbury
 Scott Sloan (footballer) (born 1967), retired English footballer
 Scott W. Sloan, professor of civil engineering at the University of Newcastle, Australia
 A. Scott Sloan (1820–1895), United States Representative from Wisconsin